Rynhardt Jonker (born 18 April 2000) is a South African rugby union player for the  in the Currie Cup and .His regular position is centre.

Jonker was named in the  side for the 2021 Currie Cup Premier Division. He made his debut for the  against the British & Irish Lions on 10 July in the 2021 British & Irish Lions tour to South Africa.
Jonker was subsequently loaned out to the Griquas for the 2022 edition of the Carling Currie Cup.

References

South African rugby union players
Living people
Rugby union centres
Sharks (rugby union) players
Sharks (Currie Cup) players
2000 births
Griquas (rugby union) players
Rugby union players from KwaZulu-Natal
Lions (United Rugby Championship) players
Golden Lions players